Pseudacanthicus leopardus is a species of armored catfish endemic to Guyana where it occurs in the Rupununi River basin.  This species grows to a length of  TL.

References
 

Ancistrini
Fish of Guyana
Endemic fauna of Guyana
Fish described in 1914